As of 2020, there are five species of birds that are considered extinct in the wild by the International Union for Conservation of Nature.

List of species 

 Socorro dove  previously endemic to Socorro Island
 Hawaiian crow  previously endemic to the Big island of Hawaii
 Alagoas curassow  previously endemic to the state of Alagoas, Brazil
 Spix's macaw  previously endemic to Bahia, Brazil
 Guam kingfisher  previously endemic to Guam

References 

Extinct in the wild birds
Extinct in the wild birds